The 1988 Tirreno–Adriatico was the 23rd edition of the Tirreno–Adriatico cycle race and was held from 11 March to 16 March 1988. The race started in Bacoli and finished in San Benedetto del Tronto. The race was won by Erich Maechler of the Carrera team.

General classification

References

1988
1988 in Italian sport
March 1988 sports events in Europe